Carwell Ernest Gardner (born November 27, 1966) is a former professional American football fullback in the National Football League. He played eight seasons in the NFL; six for the Buffalo Bills (1990–1995), one for the Baltimore Ravens (1996), finally one for the San Diego Chargers (1997).  He played college football at the University of Kentucky and the University of Louisville.

Gardner caught the first regular season pass in Baltimore Ravens history on September 1, 1996.

Gardner grew up with 3 brothers in Louisville, KY.

References 

1966 births
Living people
Players of American football from Louisville, Kentucky
American football fullbacks
Kentucky Wildcats football players
Louisville Cardinals football players
Buffalo Bills players
Baltimore Ravens players
San Diego Chargers players
Trinity High School (Louisville) alumni